Bajrakli Mosque (also spelled Bayrakli ; bayrak is Turkish for "flag" and Bayrakli means "with flag"), or variations on that name, may refer to:

Bajrakli Mosque, Belgrade, Serbia
Bajrakli Mosque, Peć, Kosovo
Bayrakli Mosque, Samokov, Bulgaria
Bayrakli Mosque, Chios, Greece
Bayrakli Mosque, Ioannina, Greece
Bayrakli Mosque, Larissa, Greece